Anthony Alland Hernandez (born 3 February 1995) is a Gibraltarian footballer who plays as an attacking midfielder for Europa. He is also a member of the Gibraltar national team. His younger brother, Andrew "Pishu" Hernandez, currently also plays for Europa.

International career
Hernandez was first called up to the Gibraltar senior team in February 2014 for friendlies against Faroe Islands and Estonia on 1 and 5 March 2014. He made his international début for Gibraltar on 1 March 2014 in a 4-1 home loss against the Faroe Islands as a 71-minute substitute. He was called up to the Gibraltar development squad for the 2015 Island Games in June 2015. He scored his first senior international goal on June 9, 2017 against Cyprus.

International goals
Score and result list Gibraltar's goal tally first.

Personal life
Hernandez's younger brother Andrew is also a footballer, playing with the Gibraltar national team.

References

External links

1995 births
Living people
Gibraltarian footballers
Association football forwards
Gibraltar international footballers
Tercera División players
Cádiz CF B players
Gibraltar United F.C. players
Lincoln Red Imps F.C. players
Manchester 62 F.C. players
Gibraltar Premier Division players
Gibraltar youth international footballers
Gibraltarian expatriate footballers
Gibraltarian expatriate sportspeople in Spain
Expatriate footballers in Spain